(born 1939) is a Japanese swimmer and Olympic medalist. He participated at the 1960 Summer Olympics in Rome, winning a bronze medal in 4 x 100 metre medley relay.

References

1939 births
Living people
Olympic swimmers of Japan
Olympic bronze medalists for Japan
Swimmers at the 1956 Summer Olympics
Swimmers at the 1960 Summer Olympics
World record setters in swimming
Olympic bronze medalists in swimming
Asian Games medalists in swimming
Swimmers at the 1958 Asian Games
Swimmers at the 1962 Asian Games
Asian Games gold medalists for Japan
Asian Games silver medalists for Japan
Medalists at the 1958 Asian Games
Medalists at the 1962 Asian Games
Medalists at the 1960 Summer Olympics
Japanese male backstroke swimmers
20th-century Japanese people